Charles Daniel White (January 5, 1879 – September 25, 1955) was an American prelate of the Roman Catholic Church. He served as bishop of the Diocese of Spokane in Washington State from 1927 until his death in 1955.

Biography

Early life 
Charles White was born in Grand Rapids, Michigan, to Patrick and Catherine (née Bolger) White. He attended St. Francis Seminary in Milwaukee, Wisconsin, before completing his studies at the Urban College of Propaganda in Rome.  He earned a Ph.D. (1907) and Doctor of Sacred Theology degree (1911).

Priesthood 
White was ordained to the priesthood for the Diocese of Grand Rapids in Rome by Cardinal Pietro Respighi on September 24, 1910. Returning to Michigan, he served as a professor (1911–1919) and rector (1919–1927) at St. Joseph Preparatory Seminary in Grand Rapids. White also served as a curate at St. Andrew's Cathedral in Grand Rapids (1911–1918) and was named a domestic prelate in 1925.

Bishop of Spokane 
On December 20, 1926, White was appointed the second bishop of the Diocese of Spokane by Pope Pius XI. He received his episcopal consecration on February 24, 1927, from Bishop Joseph G. Pinten, with Bishops Samuel Stritch and Alphonse John Smith serving as co-consecrators. He was installed on March 10, 1927, at the Cathedral of Our Lady of Lourdes. 

During his 28-year tenure, he built St. Anthony School and convent, Sacred Heart School and convent, Sisters of the Good Shepherd Home in Spokane, Marycliff High School for Girls in Spokane, St. Charles Parish, St. Joseph Parish in Trentwood, Washington, and St. John Vianney Parish in Spokane. 

In other areas of the diocese, White built the Grand Coulee Dam Parish in Grand Coulee, Washington, the nurses' home and school in Colfax, Washington and Tonasket Hospital in Tonasket, Washington.  For Native Americans, he established St. Gertrude Parish in Monse and St. Jude in Usk, Washington. He also established the Confraternity of Christian Doctrine and the National Catholic Rural Life Conference in the diocese.

Charles White died in Spokane on September 25, 1955, at age 76.

References

1879 births
1955 deaths
People from Grand Rapids, Michigan
Roman Catholic Diocese of Grand Rapids
Roman Catholic bishops of Spokane
20th-century Roman Catholic bishops in the United States
St. Francis Seminary (Wisconsin) alumni
Pontifical Urban University alumni
Religious leaders from Michigan
Catholics from Michigan